The 1857 Missouri gubernatorial special election was held on August 7, 1857.  The election was called to fill the remainder of the term of Trusten Polk, who had resigned in February 1857 upon his election to the United States Senate.  In the special election, held on August 7, 1857, the Democratic nominee, Robert Marcellus Stewart, defeated Know-Nothing candidate James S. Rollins (running under the American Party label) by a margin of only 334 votes.  This was Rollins' second run for Governor of Missouri, having also lost in the 1848 gubernatorial election.

Results

References

Missouri
1857
Gubernatorial
August 1857 events
Missouri 1857
Gubernatorial 1857